The Fairy and the Waif is a 1915 silent drama film directed by Marie Hubert Frohman and George Irving. This was the first feature-length film of actress Mary Miles Minter, who was twelve years old by the time of the release, although she had previously appeared in the 1912 short The Nurse (1912 film) under the name Juliet Shelby.

A copy is preserved at Cinémathèque Française, Paris.

Plot

As described in film magazines, Viola Drayton (Minter), the daughter of Major Drayton, is a young girl who wants to be a real fairy. When her father goes to Europe to participate in World War I, he leaves Viola in the care of his business associate Nevinson and his wife, and provides them with $30,000 to invest on Viola's behalf.

News arrives from Europe that Major Drayton has been killed in battle, and, upon hearing this, Nevinson appropriates Viola's money. This does not save him financially, however, and his wife is obliged to take in boarders. They force Viola to work as a household drudge until one day she runs away. She is taken in by a theatre company, and finds herself playing the role of a fairy.

During one rehearsal, Viola takes fright and runs away from the theatre, still dressed in her fairy costume. She encounters a homeless waif (Helton) who believes that she is a real fairy, and they shelter in a barrel together until they are found by a policeman.

Meanwhile it transpires that Major Drayton has not been killed; he returns to New York and issues a reward for his lost daughter. The policeman, recognising Viola from the description accompanying the reward, reunites her with her father, and Major Drayton also takes in the waif.

Cast
 Mary Miles Minter - Viola Drayton, the Fairy
 Percy Helton - The Waif
 Will Archie - Sweetie
 William T. Carleton - Major Drayton
 Hubert Wilke - Mr. Nevinson
 Ina Brooks - Mrs. Nevinson
 Frank Gillmore

References

External links

1915 films
Silent American drama films
American silent feature films
American black-and-white films
1915 drama films
World Film Company films
Films directed by George Irving
1910s American films